Pseudosciaphila branderiana is a moth belonging to the family Tortricidae. The species was first described by Carl Linnaeus in his landmark 1758 10th edition of Systema Naturae.

It is native to Eurasia.

References

Olethreutini